Catocala hymenoides is a moth in the family Erebidae first described by Johannes Draeseke in 1927. It is found in China.

References

hymenoides
Moths described in 1927
Moths of Asia